Mongolian nationalism may refer to:

 Historical Mongolian nationalism that led to the Mongolian Revolution of 1911 against the Qing Empire
 Historical Mongolian nationalism that led to the Mongolian Revolution of 1921 against the Chinese Republic
 Present-day Mongolian nationalism better known as Pan-Mongolism